Hugh M. Bartels is an American politician and a Republican member of the South Dakota House of Representatives representing District 5 since 2017. Bartels serves on the Committee on Appropriations, the Government Operations and Audit committee, and the Joint Committee on Appropriations. Bartel is currently the chair of the Retirement Laws committee.

References

Living people
People from Watertown, South Dakota
Republican Party members of the South Dakota House of Representatives
21st-century American politicians
Year of birth missing (living people)